Herminiocala atomosa is a moth of the family Noctuidae first described by Schaus in 1911. It is found in Costa Rica.

References

Catocalinae